Leggott is a surname. Notable people with the surname include:

Michele Leggott (born 1956), New Zealand academic and poet
Sarah Leggott (born 1970), New Zealand academic

See also
Leggett (surname)

Surnames of French origin
Surnames of English origin